Lucette Finas (born 13 July 1921) is a French author and essayist, part of the structuralist movement. She has published several articles relating interviews with French scholars and philosophers in the 1970s, like writers Nathalie Sarraute, philosopher and historian Michel Foucault or philosopher Jacques Derrida. In 1978, she was appointed an officer of the Ordre des Palmes académiques.

References

20th-century French non-fiction writers
1921 births
Living people
20th-century French essayists
French women novelists
20th-century French women writers